Schummer is a surname of:

 Jos Schummer (11 December 1930 – 17 July 1980), Luxembourgian wrestler
 Raymond Schummer (31 March 1937 – 10 October 2009), Luxembourgian wrestler
 Uwe Schummer (born 14 November 1957 in Adelaide, Australia), German politician (CDU)

See Also 
 Schumer for  people with the surname Schumer